The Distinguished Service Order is a military decoration of the United Kingdom.

Distinguished Service Order may also refer to: 

 Distinguished Service Order (Argentina)
 Distinguished Service Order (Vietnam)
 Distinguished Service Order (Singapore), Darjah Utama Bakti Cemerlang, Singapore
 Distinguished Service Order (Military), Darjah Utama Bakti Cemerlang (Tentera), Singapore

See also 
 DSO (disambiguation)